Banamali Hazra is an Indian politician. He was elected to the West Bengal Legislative Assembly from Bhatar in the 2011 West Bengal Legislative Assembly election as a member of the All India Trinamool Congress.

References

Living people
Indian politicians
Trinamool Congress politicians from West Bengal
Year of birth missing (living people)